Patterton is an area of the town of Newton Mearns, East Renfrewshire and the Deaconsbank and Jennylind areas of the City of Glasgow, Scotland.

It is served by Patterton railway station.

Suburbs in East Renfrewshire
Newton Mearns